DZJC (747 AM) Aksyon Radyo is a radio station in the Philippines owned and operated by Manila Broadcasting Company through its licensee Cebu Broadcasting Company. The station's studio and transmitter are located along J. P. Rizal St., Brgy. Sto. Tomas, Laoag.

References

News and talk radio stations in the Philippines
Radio stations established in 1968
Radio stations in Ilocos Norte